"People Come People Go" is a house song performed by French DJ David Guetta, featuring vocals from singer and long-time collaborator Chris Willis. The track was released as the third single from the album Just a Little More Love. The single was only released in Germany and France, and was not available in the United Kingdom. The music video for the track does not feature David Guetta or Chris Willis, however, features a group of people interacting amongst the scene of an underpass.

Track listing 

 German CD single (2002)
 "People Come People Go" (Radio Edit)
 "People Come People Go" (Extended Mix)

 French CD single (2002)
 "People Come People Go" (Dancefloor Killa Mix)
 "People Come People Go" (Mekaniko Dub)
 "People Come People Go" (Extended Mix)
 "People Come People Go" (Radio Edit)

Charts

References

External links
http://davidguetta.com/disco/3325374773
https://www.youtube.com/watch?v=GamfBJrJnwg
http://www.deezer.com/en/music/track/3544014+People+Come+People+Go

2002 singles
David Guetta songs
Songs written by David Guetta
Songs written by Joachim Garraud
Songs written by Chris Willis
Chris Willis songs
Song recordings produced by David Guetta